Chionanthus kinabaluensis is a tree in the family Oleaceae.

Description

Distribution and habitat
Chionanthus kinabaluensis is endemic to Borneo, where it is confined to the Tenompok Forest Reserve on Mount Kinabalu.

References

kinabaluensis
Endemic flora of Borneo
Trees of Borneo
Plants described in 2002